Betty Clooney (April 12, 1931 – August 5, 1976) was an American singer, TV presenter and pioneer who briefly rose to fame in the 1950s with sister Rosemary Clooney. She led a very brief solo career, with songs like "Kiki" and "You're All I See". She married actor and musician Pupi Campo in 1955, and they had four children.

Early years
Elizabeth Ann Clooney was born in Maysville, Kentucky. She was the second of three children, her older sister was Rosemary Clooney, her younger brother was Nicholas Joseph Clooney and her nephew was actor George Clooney.

Her father was a house painter with a drinking problem, and had a troubled marriage with his wife. Frances divorced Andrew Clooney in the late 1930s, and Frances remarried William Stone in 1939 and they had one daughter, Gail, in 1945. The family lived in Oakland, California, and resided in the John Brett Richeson House in the late 1940s. Clooney's paternal grandfather sang in his mayoral election campaigns, which he won three times. The two sisters were close.

Career

Sister act
Rosemary and Betty Clooney were a close sister act, and sang together. The family lived in Cincinnati in the early 1940s, where the girls continued to vocalize. In 1945, the sisters won a spot on Cincinnati's WLW Radio Station as singers. One day they were heard by Tony Pastor (bandleader). The bandleader originally hesitated on hiring both sisters, but soon relented and so The Clooney Sisters hit the road with the Pastor band. They appeared in a movie short with the Pastor Orchestra in 1947. The Clooney Sisters recorded a number of songs for Columbia with the Tony Pastor Band like "The Secretary Song", "I'm My Own Grandpa", and "If I Had a Million Dollars".

In 1948, Rosemary was called to New York City to record "Come On-a My House" and Betty returned home to Cincinnati. She became a television pioneer on the city's first station, WLWT. Not only was she a featured singer on the station's main program (called The 50-50 Club and broadcast on TV as well as radio), she also hosted her own shows called "Teen Canteen" and "Boy Meets Girl".

Solo career
Betty also pursued a brief solo career, far from the huge success of sister Rosemary. Betty signed to the local legendary R&B label King Records, releasing several singles including "Sisters" and "Kiki".

In the early 1950s, she was featured on the 15-minute weekday radio program The Three Suns With Betty Clooney on the Mutual Broadcasting System.

A nightclub career followed, including appearing at the Starlight Roof at the Waldorf Astoria New York. A 1954 review of her performance at The Black Orchid in Chicago, Illinois, commented, "Betty Clooney, a much more vibrant and projecting personality than her sister, Rosemary, opened here to an audience that fell immediately to her contagious charm."

In 1955, she recorded a single, "Ko Ko Mo (I Love You So)," b/w "So All Alone", with singer Bill Darnell, known for his work with bandleader Bob Chester.

In 1952, Clooney became the mistress of ceremonies of a new program, Goin' Steady, on WXYZ-TV in Detroit. The program was "said to be the most elaborate locally sponsored variety show on the air." She was a regular on three CBS television programs in the 1950s:
The Morning Show, hosted by Jack Paar, Fridays weekly (1953–1954)
Good Morning! with Will Rogers, Jr., Mondays - Fridays (1954–1955)
The Robert Q. Lewis Show, Mondays - Fridays (1955–1956)
She also appeared on countless variety shows in the 1950s where she sang, danced and acted in skits that showcased her beautiful voice and brilliant sense of humor. She recorded for several more record labels including RCA's X label, Decca's Coral label (where she had a minor hit with the song "Sin And Satin") and Columbia's Children's Records.

She also filmed several Soundies of popular hits. Although Betty recorded the hit song "Sisters" from the film White Christmas (1954) with Rosemary for Columbia's single release, in the movie Vera-Ellen's singing voice was dubbed by singer Trudy Stevens. Not one to seek fame, she subsequently retired from showbiz to raise her family, appearing only sporadically on television until her death.

Marriage
 
She married Cuban actor and singer Pupi Campo on September 7, 1955, at St Patrick's Cathedral in New York City, New York. They had one son, Carlos Alejandro, and three daughters, Cathi Ann, Cristina Maria and Rosemary Cari. The union ended with her death in 1976.

Death
Betty died on August 5, 1976, in Las Vegas, Nevada from a brain aneurysm.

Legacy
After Clooney's death, her family established the Betty Clooney Foundation for Persons with Brain Injury. It operates the Betty Clooney Center for Persons with Traumatic Brain Injury near Los Angeles. Additional funds were raised by staging annual concerts to benefit the foundation.

Partial discography
 Strangers/When You Love (You Should Love from the Heart) (1950, King 15072)
 All Over Again/It's All in the Game (1951 King 15150)
 Would I Love You (Love You, Love You)/Faithful (1951 King 15102)
 A Big City Boy Like You/Sin in Satin (1953 Coral 6100)
 You're the One/An Onion and You (1953 Round 101)
 I Idolize You/You're All I See (1953 Coral 60930)
 Si, Si, Senor/Whisper (1954 "X" 0076)
 Ki Ki/Just to Belong to You (1955 "X" 0158)

References

1931 births
1976 deaths
People from Maysville, Kentucky
Singers from Kentucky
Catholics from Kentucky
Deaths from intracranial aneurysm
Kentucky women musicians
Kentucky women television personalities
20th-century American singers
20th-century American women singers